Segambut Bypass is a major highway in Kuala Lumpur, Malaysia. This highway is maintained by the Kuala Lumpur City Hall.

List of junctions

Highways in Malaysia
Expressways and highways in the Klang Valley
Roads in Kuala Lumpur

References